WNNV (91.7 FM), branded on-air as Candelita7, is a radio station broadcasting a Spanish Contemporary Christian format. It is licensed to San German, Puerto Rico, and serves the southwestern Puerto Rico area.  The station is owned by Juan Esteban Diaz, through licensee Siembra Fertil P.R., Incorporated. The station is operated under a Time Brokerage Agreement with Ministerio En Pie de Guerra, Inc.

External links

Radio stations established in 1997
San Germán, Puerto Rico
Contemporary Christian radio stations in Puerto Rico
1997 establishments in Puerto Rico